Andrew Jackson Van Vorhes (January 24, 1824 – January 10, 1873) was an American politician and newspaper editor.

Born in Washington County, Pennsylvania, his father was Abraham Van Vorhes and his brother was Nelson H. Van Vorhes. He worked in his father's paper the Hocking Valley Gazette in Athens, Ohio. Then he and his brother bought the paper and changed the name to The Athens Messenger. He was recording clerk in the Ohio General Assembly. In 1855, Van Vorhes moved to Stillwater, Minnesota Territory, where he started the Stillwater Messenger. He served in the Union Army from 1863 to 1865, during the American Civil War, as a quartermaster. Van Vorhes also served as Indian agent at Fort Ripley in 1862. Then he served a clerk for the Minnesota Supreme Court. He also served in the Minnesota House of Representatives from 1859 to 1860. He died in Stillwater, Minnesota.

Notes

1824 births
1873 deaths
People from Washington County, Pennsylvania
People from Athens, Ohio
People from Stillwater, Minnesota
People of Minnesota in the American Civil War
Members of the Minnesota House of Representatives
Editors of Minnesota newspapers
Editors of Ohio newspapers
19th-century American politicians